Vancouverism is an urban planning and architectural phenomenon in Vancouver, British Columbia, Canada. It is characterized by a large residential population living in the city centre with mixed-use developments, typically with a medium-height, commercial base and narrow, high-rise residential towers, significant reliance on mass public transit, creation and maintenance of green park spaces, and preserving view corridors. The architect Bing Thom described Vancouverism this way:
It's a spirit about public space. I think Vancouverites are very, very proud that we built a city that really has a tremendous amount of space on the waterfront for people to recreate and to enjoy. At the same time, False Creek and Coal Harbour were previously industrial lands that were very polluted and desecrated. We've refreshed all of this with new development, and people have access to the water and the views. So, to me, it's this

idea of having a lot people living very close together, mixing the uses. So, we have apartments on top of stores. In Surrey we have a university on top of a shopping centre. This mixing of uses reflects Vancouver in terms of our culture and how we live together.

An important aspect to note is that Vancouverism is an ideal that was developed in Vancouver but is not present in all regions of the city of Vancouver. Additionally, while outlying regions of Metro Vancouver, such as Surrey, have adopted aspects of these ideals, they did not originate outside the city of Vancouver.

Vancouver has been repeatedly ranked among the most livable cities in the world. An article in San Francisco Planning and Urban Research Association has taken note of Vancouver's approach to new development and view corridors and asks if San Francisco should pursue similar direction. However, Vancouver's planning process has come under criticism for its unpredictability, lengthy approval process, lack of transparency, lack of public engagement, the repetitiveness of the built forms it produces, and the potential for the process to involve corruption.

Background
Vancouverism developed in part as a product of Vancouver's geographical context. Wedged between the sea, mountains and the border with the United States, the Greater Vancouver Regional District partnered with the area's municipalities to encourage controlled development. Early recognition that British Columbia's farmland would be engulfed by sprawl led to the establishment of the Agricultural Land Reserve in the 1970s. This assisted in containing and intensifying development throughout the Vancouver metropolitan area and the Fraser Valley.

Architect Arthur Erickson is credited by some with developing the concept that became Vancouverism in the mid-1950s, in a never-realized development called "Project 56". Many of the principles were incorporated into the development of the West End. The city's planning department, under the direction of Ray Spaxman in the 1980s, began to expand on the concepts, many of which were brought into fruition with the development of the former Expo 86 lands along False Creek and Yaletown.

Another person who is credited with influencing Vancouverism is Jane Jacobs, author of The Death and Life of Great American Cities. Brent Toderian, the former head of Planning for the City of Vancouver says of Jacobs: "There isn't a person or book more influential in creating 'Vancouverism' than Jane and The Death and Life ... I know what she means about people misunderstanding density – that's why we emphasize density done well rather than density as a mathematical exercise. [But] people 'round the world praise Vancouver's livability, and she had a big hand in it."

Aesthetics
One principle associated with Vancouverism, as evidenced by planning policy, involves protecting "view corridors". Vancouver's "View Protection Guidelines" were approved in 1989 and amended in 1990, establishing height limits to protect views of the North Shore Mountains. This approach, while credited with preserving the city's scenic backdrop, has been criticized for lessening visual interest and failing to represent the city's contemporary image. In response, Council commissioned a "Skyline Study" in 1997 which concluded that Vancouver's skyline would benefit from the addition of a handful of buildings exceeding current height limits, to add visual interest to Vancouver's skyline.

A study found that opportunities for such buildings were restricted due to a limited number of large development sites in the downtown. Eight years later, five of the seven sites identified for higher buildings had been planned or developed. The tallest of the new buildings is the Living Shangri-La hotel/residential tower, which was completed in 2008, and stands 201 metres (659 ft) tall (62 stories).

Transportation Infrastructure 
Vancouver's street grid is finely-meshed, with mid-block lanes, which has allowed the city to easily densify and promotes walkability. The overhead, visible, grade separated SkyTrain (Vancouver) transit system is an integral part of the aesthetic of Vancouverism, as it promotes a healthy lifestyle.

Planning process
One of the circumstances allowing the development of Vancouverism was the discretionary planning process implemented by the city. The planning process of Vancouver is based on collaboration by aligning the development goals of the city prior to determining the particular actions for individual drivers. Following the extended public outcry over a freeway and development program known as Project 200, Vancouver voted The Electors' Action Movement (TEAM) into power. TEAM ran on a platform of implementing more stringent design criteria and oversight to city developments. Development along South False Creek is the ideal urban form advocated by TEAM. The South False Creek development is characterized by low-density, mixed use and mixed-income residential properties with a high level of access to amenities. As well as favouring the urban form found along South False Creek, TEAM implemented significant reforms to the planning process. Discretionary planning allows the automatic approval of small developments that conform to the existing building codes. Larger projects are subject to the design review of the planning department. The planning department is empowered to make decisions that will force developments to conform to certain design guidelines.

Sustainable development
Sustainable development refers to solutions that not only benefit the present population, but also the future generations as well. This type of development requires looking at the consequences of decisions, which lead to solutions, and the consequences of those consequences too. Vancouver planners have been looking ahead of their current problems and solutions for decades. An example of this foresight can be seen in Vancouver's zoning regulations maintaining set-backs and sight-lines; and rejecting the downtown freeway, in which the city sacrificed initial gains for smaller long-term benefits and neighbourhood preservation—a trade-off that benefit current residents and later generations as well. Current issues revolve around finite energy sources and their impacts on the environment. These problems have led Vancouver to outline a growth strategy that considers the environment and community.

Criticism 

Vancouver's planning process and Vancouverism have been widely criticized, including by prominent members of the planning and architectural communities in Vancouver, such as Patrick Condon, Scot Hein and Bing Thom, for a variety of reasons. Development potential on a site is typically divided into two categories, "outright" and "discretionary". Outright development is clearly defined in terms of use, height, and floor area and can proceed along a faster track than discretionary; however, the outright development potential is less than the discretionary track. Outright limitations may include lower height, less floor area, more restrictive uses, and larger setbacks.

A developer can exceed the outright potential by negotiating with the Planning Department over the limitations on categories that have been identified in the various planning controls as "at the discretion of the Director of Planning". As noted above, this negotiating process gives the Planning Department significant leverage to negotiate design concessions or public benefits from developers; however, it does have numerous downsides, including:

 Uncertainty about development potential and costs: The absence of up-front quantifiable values for height, floor area, use and setbacks in discretionary planning make it difficult for planners, developers, architects, residents or any others to predict or forecast accurately what can be built on any site in the city or what the development costs will be;
 Lengthy planning approval: Arriving at a negotiated agreement for the development of a site – usually performed as a custom rezoning arrangement called "spot rezoning", especially for a large site – produces a significant amount of work for the developer, designer and planner; the excessive workload borne by the Planning Department on numerous such approvals at any given time causes delays in the issuing of permits for development. The City of Vancouver, as a result, has the longest wait times for permit approvals in the region.
 Opacity of negotiation: The negotiations between planners and developers involve large amounts of money and affect the public, but lack transparency despite being negotiated by public servants on behalf of citizens;
 Lack of public engagement: Because the discretionary negotiation takes place between the developer and the Planning Department, the public is not involved in the planning process until after those two parties have already agreed most of the major aspects of the development. This frequently results in significant public backlash at the required public open houses, with citizens believing that they were not adequately consulted in advance. Examples include neighbourhood plans such as those for Norquay, Marpole, Mount Pleasant, and northeast False Creek, as well as for individual projects such as the tower at Kingsway and East Broadway or the tower at 1725 Pendrell, among others;
Potential for corruption: The amount of money involved in real estate development, together with the discretionary power of planning officials and lack of transparency in negotiations, combines to create a system of development approval that can be highly prone to corruption and likely to involve dark or laundered money.

See also
 Architecture of Vancouver
 Brusselization
 James K. M. Cheng
 Manhattanization
 Neomodern architecture
 Vancouver Special

References

External links
Metro Vancouver Regional Growth Strategy 
 Translink Regional Transportation Strategy Strategic Framework
 Punter, John. The Vancouver Achievement:Urban Planning and Design. N.p.: n.p., 2004. Print.

Architecture in Canada
Culture of Vancouver
Urban studies and planning terminology